The 1992 Tour de Suisse was the 56th edition of the Tour de Suisse cycle race and was held from 17 June to 26 June 1992. The race started in Dübendorf and finished in Zürich. The race was won by Giorgio Furlan of the Ariostea team.

General classification

References

1992
Tour de Suisse